John Joseph Garrahy (November 26, 1930 – January 24, 2012), known to Rhode Islanders as J. Joseph Garrahy or just "Joe", was an American politician. He served as the 69th Governor of Rhode Island from 1977 to 1985.

Early life
Garrahy was born on November 26, 1930, in Providence, Rhode Island. Garrahy achieved the rank of Eagle Scout on August 25, 1947, at age 16. He attended La Salle Academy in Providence,. After high school, he joined the New York Air National Guard near Buffalo, and starting in 1952, he attended the University at Buffalo. In 1953, he attended the University of Rhode Island. Later that year, Garrahy joined the United States Air Force, where he served until 1955 while stationed in Upstate New York and was involved with logistics. He became a staff sergeant.

After his military service, Garrahy married Margherite De Pietro with whom he had five children. Garrahy embarked on a business career, primarily as a salesman with the Narragansett Brewing Company.

Political career
Garrahy was elected to the Rhode Island Senate in 1962 as a Democrat, and served there until 1968. While in the Senate, he also served as Deputy Majority leader from 1963 onwards.

In 1968, Garrahy was elected the 61st Lieutenant Governor of Rhode Island, and served in that office until 1977.

Governorship
In November 1976 Garrahy was elected Governor of Rhode Island, defeating Republican James Taft in the general election with 54 percent of the vote. He took office in January 1977 and served as governor until 1985, after being reelected in 1978, 1980 and 1982. By the end of his four terms, Garrahy was immensely popular, and likely could have served longer if he wanted. On his death in 2012, Garrahy was remembered as a "people's governor" and a friend of the working class.

Achievements
During his time as Governor, Garrahy:

Fought to clean up pollution in  Narragansett Bay
Worked to preserve open space for recreation
Improved the care of children with developmental disabilities
Championed programs for the elderly
Worked to transition mentally disabled people from institutions to home care
Led efforts to attract high-tech business to the state

Blizzard of 1978
The defining event of Garrahy's governorship was the Great Blizzard of February 1978. The blizzard paralyzed the entire state with up to 56 inches of snow. Garrahy lived in his office at the Rhode Island State House in Providence for three days until the crisis was under control. Garrahy was remembered for wearing a red and black plaid flannel shirt during the crisis. The shirt became widely associated with Garrahy; in 2000, he donated the shirt to the Rhode Island Historical Society, where it was placed on display. For years afterward, Garrahy would be asked about the shirt.

Garrahy's response to the storm became a template for public officials reacting to similar situations. Garrahy's calm demeanor and pleasant personality provided comfort to many Rhode Islanders in distress during the blizzard's aftermath.

In 1980, Garrahy traveled to the Soviet Union as part of an arms control delegation.

Although Republican candidates in Rhode Island were largely successful in the 1984 elections, Garrahy was not seen as a primary factor in their success.  Despite political reform being a major campaign theme for Republicans that year, there were no scandals associated with Garrahy.

Later life
In 1988, Garrahy was named to the Rhode Island Heritage Hall of Fame. He served on the board of the Providence and Worcester Railroad since 1992. He was active in the Knights of Columbus, and was also an active Rhode Island Commodore. Garrahy summered in Florida, and died in West Palm Beach on January 24, 2012.  He was buried at New Saint Francis Cemetery in South Kingstown.

References

Further reading

External links
J. Joseph Garrahy  entry at the National Governors Association

1930 births
2012 deaths
Democratic Party governors of Rhode Island
La Salle Academy alumni
Lieutenant Governors of Rhode Island
Military personnel from Rhode Island
New York National Guard personnel
Politicians from Providence, Rhode Island
Democratic Party Rhode Island state senators
United States Air Force non-commissioned officers
University at Buffalo alumni
University of Rhode Island alumni
Catholics from Rhode Island